"Liberté" (Liberty) is a 1942 poem by the French poet Paul Éluard. It is an ode to liberty written during the German occupation of France.

Description 
The poem is structured in twenty-one quatrains, which follow the same pattern. Éluard names many places, real or imaginary, on which he would write the word liberté. The first three lines of each begin with Sur (On) followed by the naming of a place, and the last line is twenty times, like a refrain, J'écris ton nom (I write your name). The 21st stanza reveals that name, saying Pour te nommer Liberté. (To name you Liberty).
The first stanza reads:

Background 
The original title of the poem was Une seule pensée (A single thought). Éluard comments:

Publication 
The poem was published on 3 April 1942, without apparent censorship, in the clandestine book of poetry Poésie et vérité 1942 (Poetry and truth 1942). According to Max Pol Fouchet, he convinced Éluard to reprint the poem in June 1942 in the magazine Fontaine, titled Une seule pensée, to reach the southern Zone libre. The same year, it was printed in London in the official Gaullist magazine La France libre and thousands of copies were dropped by parachute by British aircraft of the Royal Air Force above occupied France maquis. In 1945, the poem was published by Éditions de Minuit in Eluard's poetry book  Au rendez-vous allemand.  The complex history of Éluard's collections is detailed by the editors of his complete works, Lucien Scheler and Marcelle Dumas, particularly in Vol. 1 of Bibliothèque de la Pléiade, 1975, p. 1606–1607.

Legacy 
Francis Poulenc composed in 1943 Figure humaine, FP 120, a cantata for double mixed choir of 12 voices on this and seven other poems by Éluard. Written during the German occupation of France, it could not be performed in France, but was premiered in a radio broadcast of the BBC in English on 25 March 1945.

Liberal quotings from the poem created an underlying theme in the 2014 drama film Maps to the Stars.

References

External links 
 Full English text
 Liberté, read by Paul Eluard on YouTube
 Liberté de Paul Eluard frenchtoday.com. This link leads to a translation by a native French-speaker who understands her own language, even if native English-speakers might argue with some of the phrasing. The Full English text linked to above contains at least one error in understanding the French. "Les places qui débordent" means quite simply "squares which overflow (with people)". There are also some doubtful choices of vocabulary or interpretation. There will be many other translations on-line.
 Third page of the poem Liberté in the book Poésie et verité 1942 by Paul Eluard (Paris: , 1947) art.famsf.org
Paul Eluard’s poem Liberté used in a film by David Cronenberg: conflicting rights regarding the use of the poem in a film.
 Fifth page of the poem Liberté in the book Poésie et verité 1942 by Paul Eluard (Paris: Roger Lacourière, 1947) art.famsf.org
 Paul Éluard, "Liberty" (1943) shmoop.com

French poems
1942 poems
Poetry by Paul Éluard
French Resistance